Glyphostoma dentiferum is a species of sea snail, a marine gastropod mollusk in the family Clathurellidae.

Description
The size of an adult shell varies between 10 mm and 32 mm.

Distribution
G. dentiferum can be found in Caribbean waters, ranging from Alabama to the Florida Keys and Panama.

References

 Rosenberg, G., F. Moretzsohn, and E. F. García. 2009. Gastropoda (Mollusca) of the Gulf of Mexico, pp. 579–699 in Felder, D.L. and D.K. Camp (eds.), Gulf of Mexico–Origins, Waters, and Biota. Biodiversity. Texas A&M Press, College Station, Texas

External links
 

dentiferum
Gastropods described in 1872